ICR may refer to:

Biology
 Idiopathic condylar resorption, a temporomandibular joint disorder
 Immunological constant of rejection, Immunology concept relating to tissue rejection
 Implanted cardiac resynchronization device, in cardiology
 Imprinting Control Region, genetic imprinting

Electronics and physics
 Inductance (L), Capacitance (C), Resistance (R), see LCR meter and RLC circuit
 Instant centre of rotation, the point in a body undergoing planar movement that has zero velocity at a particular time
 Intelligent character recognition, advanced OCR
 Ion cyclotron resonance, a physics phenomenon in cyclotron particle acceleration

Organizations
 Catholic University of Rennes (Institut catholique de Rennes), a French Catholic university
 Institute for Centrifugal Research, imaginary company created by Till Nowak as the impetus behind The Centrifuge Brain Project
 Institute for Comparative Research in Human and Social Sciences, a Japanese institution in humanities and social sciences
 Institute for Creation Research, a creationist organization in Dallas, Texas
 Institute of Cancer Research, a college within the University of London
 Institute of Cetacean Research, a Japanese institution
 International Care & Relief, international development charity
 International Centre of Reconstruction
 International Rescue Committee, a global humanitarian, relief, and refugee-assistance non-government agency
 Iraqi Council of Representatives, a political council of Iraq
 Central Institute for Restoration (Istituto Centrale per il Restauro), art conservation institute in Rome
 Romanian Cultural Institute (Institutul Cultural Român)
 The Institute for Cultural Research, a London-based educational charity founded by Idries Shah

Other uses
 Industrial Cases Reports, a law report
 Inishowen Community Radio (ICR FM), a local radio station broadcasting on the Inishowen Peninsula in Ireland
 Intercolonial Railway, a historic Canadian railway
 Interest coverage ratio, a measure of a firm's ability to pay interest on outstanding debt
 International Civilian Representative for Kosovo, a civilian officer
 Islander Creole English, ISO 639-3 code
 Inter-City Railcar, class of 63 Irish diesel multiple units